Kallakurichi taluk is a taluk of Kallakurichi district of the Indian state of Tamil Nadu. The headquarters of the taluk is the town of Kallakurichi.

Demographics
According to the 2011 census, the taluk of Kallakurichi had a population of 465,236 with 230,440 males and 234,796 females. There were 981 men for every 1,000 women. The taluk had a literacy rate of 63.49%. Child population in the age group below 6 years were 23,890 Males and 26,388 Females.

References 

Taluks of Kallakurichi district